The 2021–22 Wyoming Cowboys basketball team represented the University of Wyoming during the 2021–22 NCAA Division I men's basketball season. They were led by Jeff Linder in his second year as head coach at Wyoming. The Cowboys played their home games at the Arena-Auditorium in Laramie, Wyoming as members of the Mountain West Conference. They finished the season 25–9, 13–5 in MWC play to finish in fourth place. They defeated UNLV in the quarterfinals of the MWC tournament before losing to Boise State in the semifinals. They received an at-large bid to the NCAA tournament as a No. 12 seed in the East region where they lost in the First Four to Indiana.

On February 14, 2022, the Cowboys were ranked No. 22 in the AP poll for the first time since 2015.

Previous season
In a season limited due to the ongoing COVID-19 pandemic, the Cowboys finished the 2020–21 season 14–11, 7–9 in Mountain West play to finish in eighth place in the conference. In the Mountain West tournament, they defeated San Jose State before losing to San Diego State in the quarterfinals.

Offseason

Departures

Incoming transfers

2021 recruiting class

Roster

Statistics

Schedule and results

|-
!colspan=9 style=|Non-conference regular season

|-
!colspan=9 style=|Mountain West regular season

|-
!colspan=9 style=| Mountain West tournament

|-
!colspan=9 style=| NCAA tournament

Source

References

Wyoming Cowboys basketball seasons
Wyoming
Wyoming Cowboys bask
Wyoming